The 1880 Florida gubernatorial election was held on November 2, 1880. Democratic nominee William D. Bloxham easily defeated Republican nominee Simon B. Conover with 54.90% of the vote.

General election

Candidates

Democratic 

William D. Bloxham

Republican 

 Simon B. Conover

Results

Results by County

See also 

 1880 United States presidential election in Florida
 1880 United States House of Representatives elections in Florida

References 

Florida
1880 Florida elections
Florida gubernatorial elections